Cecilia Ann Conrad (born 4 January 1955) is the CEO of Lever for Change, emeritus professor of economics at Pomona College, and managing director of the John D. and Catherine T. MacArthur Foundation. She formerly served as the Associate Dean of Academic Affairs at Pomona College. She currently oversees the foundation's MacArthur Fellows and 100&Change programs. Her research focuses on the effects of race and gender on economic status.

Early life 
Cecilia Conrad was born on January 4, 1955, in St. Louis, Missouri. Her parents, Emmett James Conrad and Eleanor Nelson Conrad, moved to Dallas after her father became the first African American surgeon to join the staff of St. Paul’s Hospital, Dallas, Texas (now St. Paul University Hospital, University of Texas Southwestern). Dr. Emmett Conrad was appointed to the Texas State Board of Education by Governor Mark White in 1984, the first African American elected to a citywide office in Dallas. Eleanor Conrad acted as his campaign manager. Cecilia was their only child.

Education 
Conrad says evening news coverage of the Vietnam War, Civil Rights Movement, and the international monetary system sparked her interest in economics. She credits her high school math teacher with helping her further this interest by helping her participate in a NSF sponsored summer math program where she learned number theory, matrix algebra, Fortran, and symbolic logic.

Conrad graduated from Wellesley College in 1976 with a degree in economics. She received her master's and doctorate in labor economics, industrial organization, and public finance from Stanford University in 1982. Also during this time, Conrad was a fellow in the Bell Laboratories Cooperative Research program, an affirmative action effort to increase the pool of women and minorities with doctoral degrees who might become future employees. She also worked as an economist at the Federal Trade Commission, Bureau of Economics, Economic Evidence Division.

She holds honorary doctorates from both Claremont Graduate University and the University of Massachusetts Dartmouth.

Career 
While still attending Stanford, Conrad worked as an economist at the Federal Trade Commission, Bureau of Economics, Economic Evidence Division. She taught at Barnard College and Duke University after graduating.

In 1995, Conrad joined the faculty at Pomona College where she served various roles including the Stedman Sumner Chair in Economics. In 2002, she was awarded California's Carnegie Professor of the Year. Conrad also served as Associate Dean of Academic Affairs at Pomona from 2004-2007, during which she expanded the summer undergraduate research program to embrace a humanities and liberal arts style education. She used her administrative position to advocate for better diversity and inclusivity on campus.

Conrad served as interim Dean of Faculty at Scripps College from 2007-2009. During this time, Conrad also served as president of the International Association for Feminist Economics (IAFFE), president of the National Economic Association, and on the board of the American Economic Association's Committee on the Status of Women in the Economics Profession (CSWEP).

In 2009, Conrad returned to Pomona and took the position of Vice President for Academic Affairs and Dean of the College, which she held until 2012. In the fall of 2012 and for that academic year, Conrad also served as Acting President.

In 2010, Conrad joined the National Science Foundation's Committee on Equal Opportunities in Science and Engineering (CEOSE), where she served as Vice Chair from 2011-2012 and Chair from 2012-present.

Conrad left her position at Pomona in January 2013, when she was asked to serve as Managing Director for the MacArthur Foundation. There, she manages the MacArthur Fellows program as well as 100&Change, two programs that provide sizable grants to "extraordinarily creative and inspiring individuals." Conrad is also the CEO of Lever for Change, which is a nonprofit affiliate of the MacArthur Foundation. This organization works specifically to make philanthropic resources available for the benefit of social change.

Conrad is a member of the Board of Trustees of Bryn Mawr College, the Poetry Foundation, the National Academy of Social Insurance, and Muhlenberg College. She is also an editor of The Review of Black Political Economy and on the editorial board of Feminist Economics.

Awards and honors 
 2018, Samuel Z. Westerfield Award, awarded by the National Economic Association
 2008, Woman of Power Award annual conference of the National Urban League
 2005, Outstanding Academic Title for African Americans in the U.S. Economy, awarded by Choice Magazine
 2002, Carnegie Professor of the Year
 2002, Wig Distinguished Professorship Award for Excellence in Teaching, awarded by Pomona College

Selected works

Books 
 
 
 
Conrad, Cecilia A (2018). “Feminist Economics: Second Wave, Tidal Wave, or Barely a Ripple?” Chapter in edited volume The Legacy of 2nd Wave Feminism in American Politics, edited by Angie Maxwell and Todd Shields, Palgrave MacMillan.

Research articles 
 
Conrad, Cecilia A; Dixson, Adrienne; Sloan Green, Clementine "Tina" (2014). “A Discussion on Gender Equity and Women of Color,” Frontiers: A Journal of Women Studies, Vol 35, #3: pp 3-14.
 
Conrad, Cecilia A (2018). “How to Mobilize Philanthropy to Advance Racial Equity? A Call to Action,” The Review of Black Political Economy, Vol. 45, #2: pp 95-103.
Conrad, Cecilia A (August 6, 2019). "Big Grant, Big Learnings,” India Development Review.

Additional appearances 

 Conrad, Cecilia A (September 3, 2014). “The Geography of Genius: New Data About MacArthur Fellows Shows That Creative People Move More,” Time.
 Conrad, Cecilia A (September 16, 2013). “Our Society Discourages Innovation,” Op-Ed, Room for Debate, The New York Times.
 Conrad, Cecilia A (September 20, 2013). “Five Myths About the MacArthur ‘Genius Grants’,” The Washington Post.
 Conrad, Cecilia A (September 26, 2017).  “Giving Away $100 Million: A Peek behind the Curtain at MacArthur Foundation,” Nonprofit Quarterly.
 Interview with Priss Benbow, Stanford Social Innovation Review podcast, “MacArthur Foundation Program Leader Reflects on Lessons From 100&Change Grant Competition” April 23, 2019.
 Is there a bubble in the liberal arts college market? (transcription), Pomona College Vice President and Dean of the College, Cecilia Conrad, speech at the 1 September 2009 Convocation.

See also 
 Feminist economics
 List of feminist economists

References

External links 
 Profile: Cecilia A. Conrad MacArthur Foundation
 Profile: Cecilia A. Conrad American Economic Association, Committee on the Status of Women in the Economics Profession (CSWEP)
 Profile: Cecilia A. Conrad Pomona College

Lever for Change

1955 births
African-American educators
African-American feminists
American feminists
Barnard College faculty
Duke University faculty
Federal Trade Commission personnel
Feminist economists
Living people
Muhlenberg College faculty
Pomona College faculty
Scripps College
Stanford University alumni
Wellesley College alumni
American women economists
African-American economists
Economists from Missouri
Economists from California
21st-century American economists
Presidents of the National Economic Association
Presidents of the International Association for Feminist Economics